Rain for a Dusty Summer, originally known as Miguel Pro and released on DVD as Guns of the Revolution, is a 1971 Mexican revolution film. Shot on location in Spain, it depicts the life and death of Mexican priest Miguel Pro during the Cristero War. The lead role was played by Humberto Almazán, an actor who left the industry to become a priest and returned to acting for this film. The movie was the final feature film of director Arthur Lubin.

Plot
In 1917 Mexico, the new government has commenced a war against the Church. Priests are rounded up and executed, churches burned down and religion outlawed. A carefree happy priest has to go on the run but returns to his nation to perform his priestly duties.

Cast
 Humberto Almazán as Miguel Pro (as Padre Humberto)
 Ernest Borgnine as The General
 Sancho Gracia as	Humberto Pro 
 Aldo Sambrell as 	Col. Marinos
 Harry Harris 	as Joe Weiler
 Nela Conjiu as Señora Pro
 Carlos Casaravilla as Capt. Larrea
 Vicente Sangiovanni as Luis Vilches
 Maida Severn as Señora Altera
Gemma Cuervo as Loreto
Marta Flores as Margarita
Tina Sáinz as Ana Pro 
 Asunción Vitoria as Nita 
 Florencio Calpe as the Rector
 Martín Porras as Roberto Pro 
Gustavo Re as a Prison Official 
 Moisés Augusto Rocha as a Witness 
Ángel Álvarez as The Bishop

Reception
Diabolique magazine later wrote "this is sometimes called a spaghetti Western, but it isn’t really… It’s more a priest-on-the-run story, where a guitar-playing man of the cloth tries to escape army prosecution during the 1917 Mexican Revolution. This film’s a hard slog, badly dubbed and veers wildly in tone (one minute the priest is in drag, the next he’s being executed by firing squad). It’s very pro-Catholic, as if Lubin was trying to make amends to the Legion of Decency for To the People of the United States by making a bad Leo McCarey movie."

See also
 The Fugitive (1947 film)
 Cristiada (film)

References

External links

Rain for a Dusty Summer at Letterbox

1971 films
American Western (genre) films
1971 Western (genre) films
Films directed by Arthur Lubin
Films about Catholic priests
Films set in Mexico
Films about Catholicism
American films based on actual events
Films shot in Spain
1970s biographical films
1970s English-language films
1970s American films